= Mysore Kalyanam =

Type of marriage in southern India

Mysore Kalyanam is a controversial and exploitative practice of marrying off poor women from the districts of Wayanad, Malappuram, Kannur, and Kozhikode in Kerala, India, to men from nearby Mysore in Karnataka. The practice often involves men from lower economic backgrounds and sometimes involving anti-social elements, engaging in fraudulent marriages with women from the Malabar region. The primary motive behind these marriages is the dowry money provided by the bride’s family. Once the financial benefit is secured, the men divorce their wives and abandon them, leaving the women to fend for themselves.

The practice often involves men who marry women under false pretences, solely to obtain dowry. In some cases, these men are unemployed, involved in criminal activities, or are drug addicts. After the marriage, they cite trivial reasons for divorce, such as the wife’s inability to learn Kannada, poor cooking skills, or failure to adapt to the local culture. Frequently, the men remarry multiple times, each time extracting dowry from the brides' families.

These marriages are often arranged by brokers who misrepresent the financial background of the men involved. These brokers typically receive 15 to 20 per cent of the dowry amount for their services, further perpetuating the cycle of exploitation. This practice has been described as a scam that targets families from economically disadvantaged backgrounds, who are often duped into believing that their daughters are marrying into a stable and prosperous family.

After the dowry is extracted, men commonly divorce their wives, leaving them in difficult circumstances. Many abandoned women are left with children to care for, with no financial support. While some women are sent back to their parental homes, either voluntarily or with the intervention of local leaders or police, others remain in the Mysore area, particularly in neighbourhoods like Shantinagar, Ghousianagar, Nehrunagar, and Kesare, which have significant Muslim populations. These women often struggle to make ends meet, as they do not want to be a burden on their families.

In many cases, the Mysore Kalyanam practice continues to be facilitated by agents who deceive the bride’s family into thinking they are arranging a legitimate marriage.
